Timothy Gabriel is a judge on the Supreme Court of Nova Scotia. In September 2010, he became the first judge appointed in Canada from the Mi'kmaq indigenous First Nations tribe.

References

Living people
21st-century First Nations people
Judges in Nova Scotia
Mi'kmaq people
Year of birth missing (living people)